Howard B. Bromberg is a retired United States Army lieutenant general. He was commissioned as an Air Defense Artillery officer upon graduation from the University of California at Davis in 1977. Bromberg is from California, and is married with two daughters.

Early life
Bromberg was born to a Jewish family in California.

Military career
Bromberg started his military life in 1977, as a second lieutenant in the Air Defense Artillery (ADA). As an officer in the ADA, he held many commands throughout his long military career. He commanded all aspects from a platoon on up to installation commander. In October 2014 Bromberg completed 37 years in the United States Army, serving as a lieutenant general. Bromberg is currently the vice president and deputy for strategy and business development, air and missile defense for Lockheed Martin Corporation.

As the United States Army Deputy Chief of Staff, G–1, Bromberg acted as the  responsible official to the ASA (M&RA), providing advice and assistance to the ASA (MR&A), this was in addition to his responsibilities and authorities as deputy chief of staff, G–1 on the Army Staff.

Education
Bromberg attended the University of California at Davis, where he graduated with a bachelor's degree in agricultural economics and management.

References

United States Army personnel of the Gulf War
Living people
United States Army generals
Recipients of the Defense Superior Service Medal
Recipients of the Distinguished Service Medal (US Army)
Recipients of the Legion of Merit
University of California, Davis alumni
Year of birth missing (living people)